The 1983 Individual Speedway Junior European Championship was the seventh edition of the European motorcycle speedway Under-21 Championships. All participants were under the age of 21. The title was won by Steve Baker of Australia.

European final
July 24, 1983
 Lonigo, Pista Speedway

References

1983
Individual Speedway Junior
Individual Speedway Junior
Speedway competitions in Italy